INS Nirbhik (K88) (Fearless) was a  of the Indian Navy. It was this ship that the first missile launch was done to demonstrate to the then Prime Minister, Defence Minister and other dignitaries. The missile was launched by Lt. G. Sri Rama Rao.

References

Vidyut-class missile boats
Fast attack craft of the Indian Navy